Kureddhoo as a place name may refer to:
 Kureddhoo (Gaafu Alif Atoll) (Republic of Maldives)
 Kureddhoo (Lhaviyani Atoll) (Republic of Maldives)
 Kureddhoo (Raa Atoll) (Republic of Maldives)